Boris Škanata (18 May 1927 – 20 October 1962) was a Yugoslav swimmer who won a bronze medal in the 100 m backstroke at the 1950 European Aquatics Championships. He finished seventh in the same event at the 1952 Summer Olympics.

Death
Škanata died in a car crash on 20 October 1962 at the 25th kilometre of the Belgrade–Zagreb highway. Also killed with him were FK Partizan footballers Čedomir Lazarević and Bruno Belin and Radnički footballer Vladimir Josipović.

Personal life
He had a son named Aleksandar (born 1951).

References

1927 births
1962 deaths
People from Tivat
Male backstroke swimmers
Swimmers at the 1952 Summer Olympics
Olympic swimmers of Yugoslavia
Montenegrin male swimmers
Montenegrin male water polo players
Yugoslav male swimmers
European Aquatics Championships medalists in swimming
Road incident deaths in Yugoslavia
Road incident deaths in Serbia